Lünen is a town in North Rhine-Westphalia, Germany. It is located north of Dortmund, on both banks of the River Lippe. It is the largest town of the Unna district and part of the Ruhr Area.

In 2009 a biogas plant was built to provide electric power to the city. Lünen is the first city in the world to receive electricity via public utility companies that is generated on the base of animal waste. The plant produces up to 6.6 MW, supplying 26,000 homes with heat and electricity.

Culture and main sights

Structure
Saint George's Church
Saint Mary's Church
Chateau of Schwansbell
Colani-UFO
Freiherr-vom-Stein School
Town hall of Lünen
Geschwister-Scholl School
Industrial Monument "Moor Crane"

Museum
Museum of the town Lünen
Mining Museum in Lünen South
Mining residential Museum in Lünen Brambauer

Theatre
Heinz-Hilpert theater

Politics
The current mayor of Lünen is independent politician Jürgen Kleine-Frauns since 2015; he was originally elected as a member of Together for Lünen (German: Gemeinsam für Lünen = GFL), but later left the party. The most recent mayoral election was held on 13 September 2020, with a runoff held on 27 September, and the results were as follows:

! rowspan=2 colspan=2| Candidate
! rowspan=2| Party
! colspan=2| First round
! colspan=2| Second round
|-
! Votes
! %
! Votes
! %
|-
| bgcolor=| 
| align=left| Rainer Schmeltzer
| align=left| Social Democratic Party
| 10,864
| 40.9
| 9,824
| 48.9
|-
| bgcolor=| 
| align=left| Jürgen Kleine-Frauns
| align=left| Independent
| 9,767
| 36.7
| 10,282
| 51.1
|-
| bgcolor=| 
| align=left| Christoph Tölle
| align=left| Christian Democratic Union
| 4,341
| 16.3
|-
| bgcolor=| 
| align=left| Sascha Gottwald
| align=left| Free Voters Lünen
| 1,624
| 6.1
|-
! colspan=3| Valid votes
! 26,596
! 97.7
! 20,106
! 98.9
|-
! colspan=3| Invalid votes
! 641
! 2.3
! 215
! 1.1
|-
! colspan=3| Total
! 27,237
! 100.0
! 20,321
! 100.0
|-
! colspan=3| Electorate/voter turnout
! 66,291
! 41.1
! 66,247
! 30.7
|-
| colspan=7| Source: City of Lünen (1st round, 2nd round)
|}

City council

The Lünen city council governs the city alongside the Mayor. The most recent city council election was held on 13 September 2020, and the results were as follows:

! colspan=2| Party
! Votes
! %
! +/-
! Seats
! +/-
|-
| bgcolor=| 
| align=left| Social Democratic Party (SPD)
| 9,066
| 33.9
|  7.0
| 19
|  3
|-
| bgcolor=| 
| align=left| Christian Democratic Union (CDU)
| 5,895
| 22.1
|  2.5
| 12
|  1
|-
| 
| align=left| Together for Lünen (GFL)
| 3,835
| 14.4
|  1.1
| 8
|  1
|-
| bgcolor=| 
| align=left| Alliance 90/The Greens (Grüne)
| 3,690
| 13.8
|  6.4
| 8
|  4
|-
| bgcolor=| 
| align=left| Alternative for Germany (AfD)
| 1,816
| 6.8
| New
| 4
| New
|-
| bgcolor=| 
| align=left| Free Democratic Party (FDP)
| 922
| 3.5
|  0.7
| 2
| ±0
|-
| bgcolor=| 
| align=left| The Left (Die Linke)
| 846
| 3.2
|  0.9
| 2
| ±0
|-
| bgcolor=| 
| align=left| Free Voters Lünen (FW Lünen)
| 501
| 1.9
| New
| 1
| New
|-
| colspan=7 bgcolor=lightgrey|
|-
| bgcolor=| 
| align=left| Independent Fohrmeister
| 85
| 0.3
| New
| 0
| New
|-
| bgcolor=| 
| align=left| Independent Rosenkranz
| 85
| 0.2
| New
| 0
| New
|-
| bgcolor=| 
| align=left| Independent God
| 19
| 0.1
| New
| 0
| New
|-
! colspan=2| Valid votes
! 26,730
! 98.2
! 
! 
! 
|-
! colspan=2| Invalid votes
! 480
! 1.8
! 
! 
! 
|-
! colspan=2| Total
! 27,210
! 100.0
! 
! 56
!  2
|-
! colspan=2| Electorate/voter turnout
! 66,291
! 41.1
!  3.4
! 
! 
|-
| colspan=7| Source: City of Lünen
|}

Twin towns - sister cities

Lünen is twinned with:

 Bartın, Turkey
 Demmin, Germany
 Kamień Pomorski, Poland
 Panevėžys, Lithuania
 Salford, England, United Kingdom
 Zwolle, Netherlands

Notable people
Jens Beutel (1946–2019), SPD politician, mayor of Mainz 1997–2011
Markus Brzenska (born 1984), footballer
Karl-Heinz Granitza (born 1951), footballer
Björn Höcke (born 1972), AfD politician, Member of Landtag in Thuringia
Theodor Kleine (1924–2014), sprint canoer, Olympic medalist
Friedhelm Konietzka (1938–2012), football player and coach 
Wilhelm Kuhne (born 1926), priest (Monsignore) and former rector of the Hardehausen Abbey
Michael Mendl (born 1944), actor
Max Raabe (born 1962), singer and conductor of the Palast Orchester in Berlin
Berndt Röder (born 1948), CDU politician, former president of the Hamburgische Bürgerschaft
Rollergirl (born 1975), singer
Rüdiger Sagel (born 1955), politician Alliance 90/The Greens, later The Left, Member of Landtag North Rhine-Westphalia 1998–2012
Max Simon (1899–1961), SS officer and war criminal
Andreas Thiel (born 1960), handball player
Eckhart Tolle (born 1948), spiritual teacher and author
Clara Vogedes (1892–1983), artist
Ernst Waldschmidt (1897–1985), orientalist and indologist
Wolfgang Wendland (born 1962), singer, politician of the Pogo party
Dieter Zorc (1939–2007), footballer

References

Unna (district)
Members of the Hanseatic League